The WAGR B class was a class of 4-6-0T tank locomotives operated by the Western Australian Government Railways (WAGR) between 1884 and 1959.

History
The first two were ordered from Kitson & Co, Leeds in 1884 to work the steeply graded Eastern Railway from Guildford to Chidlow. A further three were built by Dübs & Co, Glasgow in 1885/86 and a further six by Kitson & Co in 1898. The last batch were built with larger water tanks, with the earlier five having larger tanks retrofitted. In 1903, they were displaced by the K class and relegated to shunting duties.

Class list
The numbers and periods in service of each member of the B class were as follows:

Namesake
The B class designation was reused in the 1960s when the B class diesel locomotives entered service.

See also

Rail transport in Western Australia
List of Western Australian locomotive classes

References

Notes

Cited works

External links

Dübs locomotives
Kitson locomotives
Railway locomotives introduced in 1884
B WAGR class
3 ft 6 in gauge locomotives of Australia
4-6-0T locomotives